Kalkharan Rural District is in the Central District of Ardabil County, Ardabil province, Iran. At the census of 2006, its population was 13,564 in 3,100 households; there were 9,991 inhabitants in 2,662 households at the following census of 2011; and in the most recent census of 2016, it had increased to 10,048 in 2,978 households. The largest of its 13 villages was Soltanabad, with 1,830 people.

References 

Ardabil County

Rural Districts of Ardabil Province

Populated places in Ardabil Province

Populated places in Ardabil County